Daniela Lucía Sruoga (born 21 September 1987) is an Argentine field hockey player. At the 2012 Summer Olympics, she competed for the national team and won the silver medal. Daniela also won the 2010 World Cup in Rosario, Argentina and three Champions Trophy (2009, 2010, 2012).  Her sister, Josefina, also competed for Argentina in Olympic hockey at the 2012 Olympics.

References

External links 
 

1987 births
Living people
Field hockey players from Buenos Aires
Argentine female field hockey players
Olympic field hockey players of Argentina
Field hockey players at the 2012 Summer Olympics
Olympic medalists in field hockey
Las Leonas players
Olympic silver medalists for Argentina
Medalists at the 2012 Summer Olympics
Argentine people of Lithuanian descent
Pan American Games silver medalists for Argentina
Pan American Games medalists in field hockey
Field hockey players at the 2011 Pan American Games
Medalists at the 2011 Pan American Games